Sudheesh Sankar is an Indian film director who has directed Malayalam Television serials and few films.

He has also directed a Kollywood film Aarumaname, Sankar is known for the Dileep film Villali Veeran and the popular Malayalam TV-series  like Omanathinkal Pakshi, Ente Manasaputhri andParasparam. Sankar's new Tamil film Kathrikka Vendakka based on Organic farming is awaiting release.

Filmography

Films

Television

See also
 Cinema of India

References

External links
 

Malayalam film directors
Film directors from Kerala
Tamil film directors
Living people
21st-century Indian film directors
Year of birth missing (living people)